CP-809101 is a drug which acts as a potent and selective 5-HT2C receptor agonist. It had promising results in animal models of obesity and psychosis, but associated with genotoxicity which means that future use will be restricted to scientific research applications only.

References

Serotonin receptor agonists
Piperazines
Pyrimidines
Aromatic ethers
Chloroarenes
Pfizer brands